Nive Nielsen is a Greenlandic singer-songwriter and an actress. An Inuk from Nuuk, Greenland, as a singer-songwriter she plays with her band The Deer Children, often using a little red guitar-ukulele, which kickstarted her music career. The first concert she played was for Margrethe II of Denmark.

She appeared as an Inuk woman in The New World, starring Colin Farrell, in 2005. She also played the lead female in the first season of the AMC supernatural thriller series, The Terror, in 2018. In this series she portrayed a shaman dubbed "Lady Silence" by the crew of the Franklin expedition.

Discography

Albums

As part of Nive and the deer children
2012 – Nive Sings!
2015 – Feet First

Filmography

Movies
2005 – The New World
2019 – Togo

Television
2018 – The Terror as Lady Silence
2021 - The North Water as Anna

References

External links

 http://niveandthedeerchildren.com/
 https://www.discogs.com/artist/4138507-Nive-Nielsen-The-Deer-Children

 http://finespind.dk/index.php/artikler-og-billedserier/788-portraet-af-den-fremadstormende-gronlandske-musiker-og-skuespiller-nive-nielsen-interview

Living people
People from Nuuk
Greenlandic women singers
Greenlandic actresses
Inuit actresses
Inuit musicians
Inuit women
1979 births
Carleton University alumni
21st-century Danish  women  singers